A market run or run on the market occurs when consumers increase purchasing of a particular product because they fear a shortage. As a market run progresses, it generates its own momentum: as more people demand the item, the supply line becomes unable to keep up. This causes a local shortage, which in turn encourages further hoarding.

Examples include a run on the gasoline market following hurricane Katrina in 2005, an ammunition shortage following President Obama's election in 2008, and a run on toilet paper following a Johnny Carson joke on The Tonight Show in 1973.

See also
 Bank run
 Panic buying

References

Consumer behaviour